2-Methoxyestradiol (2-ME2, 2-MeO-E2) is a natural metabolite of estradiol and 2-hydroxyestradiol (2-OHE2). It is specifically the 2-methyl ether of 2-hydroxyestradiol. 2-Methoxyestradiol prevents the formation of new blood vessels that tumors need in order to grow (angiogenesis), hence it is an angiogenesis inhibitor. It also acts as a vasodilator and induces apoptosis in some cancer cell lines. 2-Methoxyestradiol is derived from estradiol, although it interacts poorly with the estrogen receptors (2,000-fold lower activational potency relative to estradiol). However, it retains activity as a high-affinity agonist of the G protein-coupled estrogen receptor (GPER) (10 nM, relative to 3–6 nM for estradiol).

Clinical development
2-Methoxyestradiol was being developed as an experimental drug candidate with the tentative brand name Panzem. It has undergone Phase 1 clinical trials against breast cancer. A phase II trial of 18 advanced ovarian cancer patients reported encouraging results in October 2007.

Preclinical models also suggest that 2-methoxyestradiol could also be effective against inflammatory diseases such as rheumatoid arthritis. Several studies have been conducted showing 2-methoxyestradiol is a microtubule inhibitor and is inhibitory against prostate cancer in rodents.

, all clinical development of 2-methoxyestradiol has been suspended or discontinued. This is significantly due to the very poor oral bioavailability of the molecule and also due to its extensive metabolism. Analogues have been developed in an attempt to overcome these problems. An example is 2-methoxyestradiol disulfamate (STX-140), the C3 and C17β disulfamate ester of 2-methoxyestradiol.

Clinical effects
2-Methoxyestradiol was found to increase sex hormone-binding globulin (SHBG) levels in men by 2.5-fold at a dose of 400 mg/day and by 4-fold at a dose of 1,200 mg/day. Conversely, it did not seem to suppress testosterone levels.

See also
 2-Methoxyestriol
 2-Methoxyestrone
 4-Methoxyestradiol
 4-Methoxyestrone
 MP-2001

References

Abandoned drugs
Angiogenesis inhibitors
Antineoplastic drugs
Estranes
Ethers
GPER agonists
Human metabolites
Hypolipidemic agents
Microtubule inhibitors
Mitotic inhibitors
Phenols